Newspapers in the United States have traditionally endorsed candidates for party nomination prior to their final endorsements for President. Below is the list of endorsements in 2012, by candidate, for each primary race.

Democrats

Barack Obama
President Barack Obama had no significant opposition in his campaign for renomination in 2012. However, the following newspapers specifically endorsed him for the Democratic nomination:

Republicans

Newt Gingrich

Jon Huntsman

Ron Paul

Mitt Romney

References

2012 United States presidential election endorsements
Newspaper endorsements
2012 in mass media